Tegla Chepkite Loroupe (born 9 December 1979) is a Kenyan long-distance track and road runner. She is also a global spokeswoman for peace, women's rights and education. Loroupe holds the world records for 25 and 30 kilometers and previously held the world marathon record. She was the first African woman to hold the marathon World Record, which she held from 19 April 1998 until 30 September 2001. She is the three-time World Half-Marathon champion. Loroupe was also the first woman from Africa to win the New York City Marathon, which she has won twice. She has won marathons in London, Rotterdam, Hong Kong, Berlin and Rome.

In 2016, she was the person organizing the Refugee Team for the 2016 Summer Olympics in Rio.

Biography
Tegla Loroupe was born in Kapsait village in the Lelan division of West Pokot District. It is situated in the Rift Valley, approximately 600 kilometres north of Nairobi. Her father and mother are from the Pokot tribe, a Nilotic ethnic group inhabiting parts of northern Kenya, eastern Uganda and southern Ethiopia.

Loroupe was told by her father that she was useless and her career might be babysitting. She grew up with 24 siblings. The Pokots being a polygamous culture, her father had four wives. She spent her childhood working fields, tending cattle and looking after younger brothers and sisters.

At the age of six, Loroupe started school at Kapsait Elementary school; she had to run ten kilometers to and from school every morning. At school, she became aware of her potential as an athlete when she won races held over a distance of 800 or 1500 meters against much older students. She decided to pursue a career as a runner. However, she was not supported by anyone but her mother.

The Kenyan athletics federation, Athletics Kenya, did not support her at first, thinking Loroupe too small and too thin. However, after she won a prestigious cross country barefoot race in 1988, this changed. She began to train to compete internationally the following year, earning her first pair of running shoes in 1989, which she wore only for particularly rough races. She was nominated for the junior race of the 1989 IAAF World Cross Country Championships finishing 28th. She competed again at the 1990 IAAF World Cross Country Championships, finishing 16th in the junior race.

In 1994 and 1998, Loroupe won the Goodwill Games over 10,000 metres, barefoot. Over the same distance she won bronze medals at the World Athletics Championships in 1995 and 1999.

In 1994, Loroupe ran her first major marathon in New York. Running against the world's strongest competition, she won. As a consequence she was idolised by many young people in Africa: at last, a woman champion to complement the many successful male runners. She won the New York City Marathon again in 1995 and finished 3rd in 1998.

Between 1997 and 1999, she won three world titles a row over the half marathon distance. She won Rotterdam Marathon three times between 1997 and 1999. She won Berlin Marathon in 1999 and finished second in 2001. She finished second at the 1999 Osaka International Ladies Marathon.
 
Loroupe won the Zevenheuvelenloop 15K race in the Netherland three times (1992, 1993 and 1998).
She is a seven-time Egmond Half Marathon winner (1993–1998, 2000). She has won the Lisbon Half Marathon a record six times: 1994–1997, 1999 and 2000. She has won the Tilburg road race, a five times (1993, 1994, 1996, 1998, 1999), also a record number. She won the Paris Half Marathon in 1994 and 1998, City-Pier-City Loop half marathon in the Hague in 1998, and the Parelloop 10K in race in the Netherlands in 1999

During the 2000 Summer Olympics in Sydney, favoured to win both the marathon and the 10,000 meters, she suffered from violent food poisoning the night before the race. Nevertheless, she fought through the marathon race, finishing 13th, then, the next day, ran the 10,000 metres, finishing 5th, running barefoot in both races, a feat she later stated she achieved out of a sense of duty to all the people taking her as a bearer of hope in her home country. Until the end of 2001, she continued to suffer from various health problems.

In 2000, she won London Marathon and Rome City Marathon. She also won Lausanne Marathon in 2002, Cologne Marathon in 2003 and Leipzig Marathon in 2004.

Loroupe competed at the 2005 World Championships marathon race in Helsinki, Finland, but finished only 40th. In February 2006 she won the Hong Kong Half-Marathon. The same year she finished 5th in the Rotterdam Marathon and 2nd in the Venice Marathon. In 2007, she participated again the New York City Marathon, finishing 8th.

Loroupe's biggest successes include world records over 20, 25 and 30 kilometers as well as the past record over the marathon distance. She used to hold the One Hour running World record of 18,340 m set in Borgholzhausen, Germany, but the record was broken by Dire Tune of Ethiopia ten years later, in 2008 (new record 18,517 m).

Goodwill 

In 2006, she was named a United Nations Ambassador of Sport by Secretary General Kofi Annan, together with Roger Federer, tennis champion from Switzerland, Elias Figueroa, Latin American soccer legend from Chile, and Katrina Webb paralympics gold medalist from Australia. She is an International Sports Ambassador for the IAAF, the International Association of Athletics Federations, and for UNICEF.

In 2003, Loroupe created an annual series of Peace Marathons sponsored by the Tegla Loroupe Peace Foundation "Peace Through Sports". Presidents, Prime Ministers, Ambassadors and government officials run with warriors and nomadic groups in her native Kenya, in Uganda and in Sudan, to bring peace to an area plagued by raiding warriors from battling tribes. In 2010 the Kenyan Government lauded her achievements as hundreds of warriors had laid down their weapons.

She has established a school (Tegla Loroupe Peace Academy) and orphanage for children from the region in Kapenguria, a high-mountain town in north-west Kenya.

The 2006 Peace Marathon was held on 18 November 2006, in Kapenguria, Kenya. Two thousand warriors from six tribes competed. The next Peace Marathon was 15 November 2008 in Kapenguria, Kenya.  National ambassadors to Kenya participated, together with the Prime Minister, and several Kenyan, Tanzanian, and Ugandan Ministers. The Peace Marathon has been held each year since then, with the exception of the past two Covid years. Winners of the races often begin professional training in long-distance running, or join the training team of ex-warriors.

In February 2007, she was named the Oxfam Ambassador of Sport and Peace to Darfur.  In December 2006, she travelled with George Clooney, Joey Cheek, and Don Cheadle to Beijing, Cairo, and New York on a diplomatic mission to bring an end to violence in Darfur. She won the "Community Hero" category at the 2007 Kenyan Sports Personality of the Year awards.

In November 2009, Tegla represented the Shoe4Africa team. running the New York Marathon alongside founder Toby Tanser and actress Sarah Jones finishing in 3:54:02.

Loroupe is a member of the 'Champions for Peace' club, a group of 54 famous elite athletes committed to serving peace in the world through sport, created by Peace and Sport, a Monaco-based international organisation.

As reported by Olympic news outlet Around the Rings, the IOC recognised six women, five from each continent and one to represent the world, for their achievements and their work to promote women's sport. Loroupe was awarded the world trophy.

In 2015 Loroupe became an Ambassador for the Homeless World Cup.

In 2016, she was the Chef de Mission organizing the Refugee Team for the 2016 Summer Olympics. At those games Loroupe was inducted into the Olympians for life project for her work in promoting peace. In October 2016 Loroupe was awarded United Nations Person of the Year.

International competitions

Marathons

References

External links

 
 Biography of Tegla Laroupe at Biography Online
 Marathoninfo profile
 Tegla Loroupe Peace Foundation "Peace Through Sports"

1979 births
Living people
People from West Pokot County
Kenyan female long-distance runners
Kenyan female marathon runners
Kenyan female cross country runners
Olympic athletes of Kenya
Athletes (track and field) at the 1992 Summer Olympics
Athletes (track and field) at the 1996 Summer Olympics
Athletes (track and field) at the 2000 Summer Olympics
Goodwill Games medalists in athletics
World Athletics Championships athletes for Kenya
World Athletics Championships medalists
World Athletics Half Marathon Championships winners
London Marathon female winners
New York City Marathon female winners
World Athletics record holders
Recipients of the Order of the Golden Heart of Kenya
Recipients of the Association of International Marathons and Distance Races Best Marathon Runner Award
Competitors at the 1998 Goodwill Games
Competitors at the 1994 Goodwill Games